Aldo Falivena (18 February 1928 – 22 November 2021) was an Italian journalist.

Biography
Falivena was born on 18 February 1928 in Salerno. He died on 22 November 2021, at the age of 93.

References

1928 births
2021 deaths
Italian journalists
People from Salerno